Bandrów Narodowy  is a village in the administrative district of Gmina Ustrzyki Dolne, within Bieszczady County, Subcarpathian Voivodeship, in south-eastern Poland, near the border with Ukraine.

The village has an approximate population of 500.

See also
1951 Polish–Soviet territorial exchange

References

Villages in Bieszczady County